"Magic Rhythm" is a pop song written by Terry Britten and B. A. Robertson and recorded by Australian pop singer Christie Allen. The song was released in May 1980 as the fifth and final single from Allen's debut studio album, Magic Rhythm (1979). The song peaked at number 38 on the Kent Music Report in Australia.

Track listing 
7" (K 7917) 
Side A – "Magic Rhythm" - 3:04
Side B – "Only Yes Will Do"  - 4:00

Charts

References 

1979 songs
1980 singles
Christie Allen songs
Songs written by Terry Britten
Mushroom Records singles
Songs written by BA Robertson